The following is a list of Cook Islands national rugby league team results from their debut in 1986.

1980s

1990s

2000s 

? * New Zealand Māori def. Cook Islands 24–12, December 2006 
? * Cook Islands def. New Zealand Māori 18–16, December 2006
? * Tonga def. Cook Islands 38–30 (4 October 2004)

2010s

2020s

Other Games 

 October 1994 – Rotuma Fiji 17–10 Cook Islands, 1994 Pacific Cup, National Stadium, Suva
 16 October 2010 – NSW Country 22–26 Cook Islands, Friendly, Scully Park, Tamworth, 2,000

See also

References

External links

Cook Islands national rugby league team
Rugby league-related lists